Panarchy may refer to:

 Panarchy (Dartmouth), student society at Dartmouth College
 Panarchy (ecology)

 Panarchy (political philosophy), a political philosophy that emphasizes an individual's right to choose their governmental jurisdiction without changing their physical location